Notable events of 2019 in webcomics.

Events

Awards
 Aurora Awards, "Best Graphic Novel" won by Kari Maaren's It Never Rains
 Cartoonist Studio Prize, "Best Web Comic" won by Lauren Weinstein's Being an Artist and a Mother
 Eisner Awards, "Best Webcomic" won by Sophie Yanow's The Contradictions
 Harvey Awards, "Digital Book of the Year" won by Ngozi Ukazu's Check, Please!
 Ignatz Awards, "Outstanding Online Comic" won by Hannah Blumenreich's Full Court Crush
 Next Manga Award, "Web Manga" won by Tatsuya Endo's Spy × Family
 Reuben Awards, "Online Comics": Short Form won by Dorothy Gambrell's Cat and Girl, Long Form won by Yuko Ota and Ananth Hirsh's Barbarous
 Ringo Awards, "Best Webcomic" won by The Nib

Webcomics started

 January 17–April 11 — Save Me by Big Hit Entertainment & Studio LICO
 February 1 - Joe vs Elan School by Joe Nobody
 March 22 — #Killstagram by Ryoung
 March 25 — Spy × Family by Tatsuya Endo
 April 9–September 17 — STARCROSS by Dean Haspiel
 April 11 — Pixie Trix Comix by Gisele Lagace, Dave Lumsdon, and T Campbell
 August 13 — Crossdressing Pandemic by Mikuzu Shinagawa
 August 14 — Alien Salesmen by Finn Suillivan
 October 31 — Fangs by Sarah Andersen
 December 26 — I Think I Turned My Childhood Friend into a Girl by Azusa Banjo
 December – Senpai wa Otokonoko by Pom

Webcomics ended
 No Need for Bushido by Alex Kolesar & Joseph Kovell, 2002 – 2019
 Noblesse by Son Je-ho and Lee Kwang-su, 2007 – 2019
 Ménage à 3 by Gisele Lagace & Dave Lumsdon, 2008 – 2019
 Denma by Yang Yeong-soon, 2010 – 2019
 Dents by Beth Behrs, Matt Doyle & Sid Kotian, 2016 – 2019
 Days of Hana by Seok-woo, 2017 – 2019
 Gaus Electronics by Gwak Baek-soo, 2011 – 2019
 Refund High School by Croissant and Studio LICO, 2018 – 2019
 Cheshire Crossing (2nd version) by Andy Weir and Sarah Andersen, 2017 – 2019

References

 
Webcomics by year